This is a list of the National Register of Historic Places listings in Yellowstone National Park.

This is intended to be a complete list of the properties and districts on the National Register of Historic Places in Yellowstone National Park, Wyoming and Montana, United States.  The locations of National Register properties and districts for which the latitude and longitude coordinates are included below, may be seen in a Google map.

There are 19 properties and districts listed on the National Register in the park, five of which are National Historic Landmarks.

Current listings 

|}

See also 
 National Register of Historic Places listings in Teton County, Wyoming
 National Register of Historic Places listings in Park County, Wyoming
 National Register of Historic Places listings in Park County, Montana
 List of National Historic Landmarks in Wyoming
 National Register of Historic Places listings in Wyoming
 National Register of Historic Places listings in Montana

References 
Culpin, Mary Shivers. National Register of Historic Places Multiple Property Documentation Form: Historic Resources of Yellowstone National Park. National Park Service 1995

External links